Mimoceps insignis is a species of plant bug from the Miridae family. It can be found in grass and open fields of the United States.

Description

References

Insects described in 1890
Endemic fauna of the United States
Miridae